This is a complete list of lieutenant generals in the United States Air Force before 1960, including those appointed in the United States Army from the United States Army Air Forces or United States Army Air Corps before the Air Force was established in 1947. The grade of lieutenant general (or three-star general) is ordinarily the second-highest in the peacetime Air Force, ranking above major general and below general.

List of U.S. Air Force lieutenant generals before 1960
The following list of lieutenant generals includes all officers of the United States Air Force, United States Army Air Forces, and United States Army Air Corps who were appointed to that rank prior to January 1, 1960.

Entries are indexed by the numerical order in which each officer was appointed to that rank while on active duty, or by an asterisk (*) if the officer did not serve in that rank while on active duty. Each entry lists the officer's name, date of rank, date the officer vacated the active-duty rank, number of years on active duty as lieutenant general (Yrs), positions held as lieutenant general, and other biographical notes.

Italics denote active duty as lieutenant general while on the retired list.

Timeline
An officer held the active-duty grade of lieutenant general (Lt.gen.) in the U.S. Army (USA) or U.S. Air Force until his death, retirement, resignation, reassignment to a lesser position, or promotion to a higher grade such as general (Gen.) or general of the Army (Gen.Army).

History

The United States Air Force originated as the Air Corps of the Regular Army. During World War II the Regular Army was augmented with a larger temporary force of reservists, volunteers, and conscripts to form the Army of the United States. Air personnel in the combined force belonged to the Army Air Forces. After the war, all Air Corps and Army Air Forces personnel split off from the Army to form the independent Air Force.

1939–1947 (U.S. Army Air Forces)

The first United States airman to become a lieutenant general was Delos C. Emmons, commanding general of General Headquarters Air Force, who was appointed to that grade under a 1940 law authorizing the President to appoint Regular Army officers to temporary higher grades in the Army of the United States. The first airman to become a lieutenant general in the Regular Army was Frank M. Andrews, who was automatically elevated to that grade upon assuming command of the Panama Canal Department in 1941. The Regular Army grade of lieutenant general had been abolished at the end of World War I, but was revived in 1939 when Congress authorized the officers commanding certain important Army formations to be temporarily appointed to the grade while detailed to those positions; these commands included the four field armies and the Panama Canal and Hawaiian Departments.

Numerous airmen were promoted to lieutenant general during World War II. Lieutenant generals typically commanded one of the numbered field armies or air forces; served as deputy theater commanders; or headed major headquarters staffs, administrative commands, or support organizations. Most World War II lieutenant generals were appointed to that grade in the Army of the United States, even if detailed to a position that already carried the Regular Army grade; unlike the ex officio Regular Army grade, which was lost if an officer was reassigned, the Army of the United States grade was personal to each individual, making it easier to transfer officers without inadvertently demoting them.

Although most air lieutenant generals belonged to the Regular Army Air Corps, anyone could be appointed lieutenant general in the Army of the United States, including reservists and civilians; James H. Doolittle was promoted to lieutenant general as an Air Corps Reserve officer and William S. Knudsen was commissioned lieutenant general directly from civilian life.

1947–1960 (U.S. Air Force)

The National Security Act of 1947 transferred all personnel in the Army Air Forces, Air Corps, and General Headquarters Air Force to the newly created United States Air Force. Lieutenant generals in the new service typically headed divisions of the Air Staff in Washington, D.C.; the unified command in Alaska; the theater air forces in Europe or the Far East; or the Air Force's top-level strategic, tactical, air defense, materiel, or transportation commands. Many early three-star commands were subsequently upgraded to four stars, and their vice commanders were elevated to three stars along with the commanders of the larger numbered air forces.

All three- and four-star ranks were made ex officio by the Officer Personnel Act of 1947, meaning that a lieutenant general had to be reconfirmed in that grade every time he changed jobs. During the Korean War the Far East Air Forces (FEAF) vice commander for operations, Major General Otto P. Weyland, was slated for a three-star job in the United States but Air Force Chief of Staff Hoyt S. Vandenberg wanted Weyland to be promoted to lieutenant general while still in the war zone, so Vandenberg created the new three-star position of deputy commanding general of FEAF just for Weyland. Once promoted, Weyland immediately returned stateside but remained technically assigned to FEAF in order to keep his new grade while waiting for the Senate to confirm him in his permanent three-star assignment as commanding general of Tactical Air Command.

It was rare but not unheard of for a lieutenant general to be demoted by accepting a transfer to a lower ranking job. Air Force Inspector General Truman H. Landon and Fifth Air Force commanding generals Frank F. Everest and Glenn O. Barcus all reverted to major general for their next assignments but regained their third stars in subsequent postings. Conversely, Major General Muir S. Fairchild skipped three-star rank entirely when he was appointed to the four-star office of vice chief of staff of the Air Force.

Legislative history
The following list of Congressional legislation includes all acts of Congress pertaining to appointments to the grade of lieutenant general in the United States Air Force or United States Army Air Forces before 1960.

Each entry lists an act of Congress, its citation in the United States Statutes at Large, and a summary of the act's relevance.

See also

Lieutenant general (United States)
General officers in the United States
List of United States Air Force four-star generals
List of lieutenant generals in the United States Army before 1960
List of United States Navy vice admirals on active duty before 1960
List of United States Marine Corps lieutenant generals on active duty before 1960
List of United States Air Force lieutenant generals from 2000 to 2009
List of United States Air Force lieutenant generals from 2010 to 2019
List of United States Air Force lieutenant generals since 2020

Notes

Bibliography

Biographical registers

Other publications

Air Force
United States Air Force
 
Lieutenant generals before 1960
United States Air Force generals